The computed tomography dose index (CTDI) is a commonly used radiation exposure index in X-ray computed tomography (CT), first defined in 1981. The unit of CTDI is the gray (Gy) and it can be used in conjunction with patient size to estimate the absorbed dose. The CTDI and absorbed dose may differ by more than a factor of two for small patients such as children.

Definitions
Because CT scanners typically acquire multiple slices during a single rotation with a single beam, the CTDI is calculated by integrating over the dose profile for a single axial rotation, then dividing by the nominal beam width:

This measurement is most often made using a 100-mm standard pencil dose chamber as this is representative of a typical scan length:

.

The absorbed dose to water  (used to refer back to patient dose) is typically measured in a cylindrical head (16 cm diameter) or body (32 cm diameter) phantom of length approximately 14–15 cm.

The dose distribution imparted by a CT scan is much more homogeneous than that imparted by radiography, but is still somewhat larger near the skin than in the centre of the body. The weighted CTDI was introduced to account for this:

using measurements acquired at central and peripheral positions in the head or body phantoms described above.

CTDI in helical CT 
In helical CT, the pitch of the machine - a factor of the speed at which the couch travels through the gantry  and the tube rotation frequency - also impacts on patient dose. The pitch factor, P, is defined as

The following quantity is therefore used to take account of pitch:

Similar measures with yet wider chambers are useful for CT systems with large numbers of detector rows.

CTDI can also be measured with polymer gel dosimetry.

Relation to DLP 
The dose-length product (DLP) is a quantity defined for use in CT as

This quantity is analogous to the dose-area product (DAP) used in planar radiography.

References 

X-ray computed tomography